The Arrowfield Stud Plate is a New Zealand Thoroughbred horse race run at Hastings Racecourse in Hawke's Bay. The race is registered as the Horlicks Plate and has been previously known as:

 the Windsor Park Plate. In 2022 the race sponsor and naming rights changed from the Windsor Park Stud to the Arrowfield Stud.  
 the Stoney Bridge Stakes from 2004 to 2008. 
 the Glenmorgan Generous Stakes, in 2003, when it was raced at Otaki. 
 the Glenmorgan Hawkes Bay Challenge Stakes.

It is run over a distance of 1600m in late September or early October. It was a Group 3 race until 2001 and Group 2 until 2004.

It is the second of the Hawkes Bay Triple Crown of Group 1 weight-for-age races. The others are:

 the 1400m  Challenge Stakes currently known as the Tarzino Trophy, and 
 the 2040m Livamol Classic. 

Other major races run during the carnival are:
 the Gold Trail Stakes for three-year-old fillies at Group 3 level. This race marks the beginning of the New Zealand Filly of the Year series. 
 the Hawke's Bay Guineas. 

In the COVID 19 affected 2020/21 season the Windsor Park Plate was raced on 3 October 2020.  The same meeting held the Hawke's Bay Guineas whereas the Hawke's Bay Breeders Gold Trail Stakes was held a fortnight earlier on September 19 along with the Tarzino Trophy.

In 2022 the scheduled meeting at Hastings was cancelled and the race was moved to the following week and raced at Matamata.

Recent results

See also

A table listing winners of all 3 of the Hawkes Bay Triple Crown is included in Thoroughbred racing in New Zealand, along with tables showing the recent winners of other major New Zealand races.

References

Horse races in New Zealand